Into You may refer to:

"Into You" (Fabolous song), 2003
"Into You" (Ariana Grande song), 2016
"Into You", a song by 3Deep, 1999
"Into You", a song by Carolyn Dawn Johnson from Love & Negotiation, 2006
"Into You", a song by Cat Burns, 2021
"Into You", a song by the Cinematic Orchestra from Ma Fleur, 2007
"Into You", a song by Funkadelic from One Nation Under a Groove, 1978
"Into You", a song by Giant Steps, 1988
"Into You", a song by Julia Michaels from Inner Monologue Part 1, 2019
"Into You", a song by Jun Hyo-seong, 2015
"Into You", a song by KARD from You & Me, 2017
"Into You", a song by Melanie C from Melanie C, 2020
"Into You", a song by Pepper MaShay, 1998

See also
N II U (pronounced "Into You"), an American R&B group
So into You (disambiguation)